Anor Londo is a fictional city in the Dark Souls series of action role-playing games. Appearing in both Dark Souls and Dark Souls III, it is the seat of the power of the gods, deities of the Dark Souls world who used the power of the First Flame to destroy the Everlasting Dragons that once controlled it. By the time of Dark Souls, however, it has become an abandoned lost city, as Lord Gwyn had long since sacrificed himself to rekindle the fading First Flame. Anor Londo has been cited by critics for its design as well as the level's high difficulty, including a section guarded by two powerful archers, and the level's final boss duo, Ornstein and Smough.

Level content

Dark Souls
The player character arrives in Anor Londo after completing Sen's Fortress. After dispatching the boss of the area, the Iron Golem, the player is carried over the otherwise sealed-off wall of Anor Londo by a pack of winged demons. As one of the only non-ruined areas of Lordran, Anor Londo stands in contrast to the other levels of the game. Following their arrival, the player must then travel to Gwyn's Keep to obtain the Lordvessel, passing many obstacles. This includes a duo of Silver Knight archers that guard the buttress leading to a side balcony entrance of the Keep. After fighting their way through the Keep itself, the player must face the level's dual bosses, Dragonslayer Ornstein and Executioner Smough, to gain access to Gwynevere, Princess of Sunlight. She awards the player the Lordvessel, allowing the player to warp away from the level.

Dark Souls III
When the player revisits Anor Londo, it is bathed in moonlight, frozen over, and has fallen to visible levels of decay. Pathways near the central elevator have crumbled, and force the player to explore a different side of the city. Additionally, a new path exists where a former bonfire once stood. The terrain of Lordran has also clearly shifted heavily over time, with large chunks of Anor Londo and its surrounding walls having vanished, and a new palace being visible in the distance. As the player progresses into Lord Gwyn's keep, parts are blocked off by collapse, and the entire location is waterlogged, full of debris, but decorated with new features such as cloth curtains. In the same room where Ornstein and Smough were formerly fought, the player must face Aldrich, Devourer of Gods, in order to obtain his power and return it to Firelink Shrine.

Plot 
Anor Londo was created by Gwyn, ruler of the gods, to consolidate his power after ushering in the Age of Fire. Many centuries later, upon the fading of the First Flame, he was forced to leave the city along with half of his Silver Knight army to rekindle the flame. At the time of Dark Souls, the only remaining deity in Anor Londo is Gwyndolin, who presides over the Darkmoon covenant. He creates the illusion of sunlight, as well as Princess Gwynevere, to compel the Chosen Undead to defeat Gwyn and rekindle the First Flame yet again. If the player attacks Gwynevere, the illusion is shattered and the city reverts to its true appearance, shrouded in darkness.

By the time of Dark Souls III, the city was repopulated and renamed Irithyll. However, it is taken over by a dark sorcerer named Sulyvahn, who enslaved the city's populace and turned them into monstrosities. Sulyvahn would later be allied with Aldrich, Devourer of Gods, a former human cleric who mutated into an amorphous blob due to his cannibalism, and one of the five Lords of Cinder resurrected to link the First Flame. The player finds Aldrich housed within the cathedral of Gwyn's ruined keep, in the process of slowly consuming the very body and soul of the still-living Gwyndolin.

Development 

Anor Londo was designed to feel like a reward after completing Sen's Fortress, but also presented no clear path to the player, forcing them to take a number of side paths, like walking up the flying buttresses. The city's spiral staircases were meant to represent life.

The city's design was inspired by that of Milan Cathedral, which was visited in person by Dark Souls designer Masanori Waragai. The game's director, Hidetaka Miyazaki, felt that the sense of excitement the player feels upon entry to Anor Londo does not last for the level's entirety.

Reception 
Edge called Anor Londo "as beautiful as it is deadly" and "where Dark Souls casts off restraint". Comparing it to the Divine Comedy, and the strata traversed by Dante in the poem, they equated Anor Londo with Heaven, and that it therefore "makes sense that it's the one area in the game you are incapable of reaching by your own agency". Calling the first glimpses of Anor Londo "dazzling", they state that since Dark Souls is "so bleak at times, so starved of warmth and light", the city's beauty "seems almost eye-shadingly pornographic". Kotaku cited the environmental storytelling of the city's design, where the obvious path forward is blocked, showing the player they do not belong there. Patrick Klepek of Kotaku called the appearance of Anor Londo in Dark Souls III a "highlight" of his playthrough and the city's architecture "beautiful" and "haunting".

Den of Geek called Anor Londo one of "gaming's greatest levels", saying that it "represents the core appeal of Dark Souls", by being designed to "intimidate and impress" the player, as well as being full of mysteries. Cian Maher of The Washington Post called Anor Londo one of the "eight wonders of the virtual world", calling the "gorgeously lit skyline" "striking" in comparison to the darkness of the rest of the game, and stating that "the people - or deities - who inhabit the city also contribute to its sublimity." Eurogamer called revisiting Anor Londo in Dark Souls III a "surreal, melancholy experience" that "ranks among Dark Souls III's many high points", but also "shows how the series line has evolved, both technically and in its visual direction".

The Silver Knight archers of Anor Londo were criticized by PC Gamer Joe Donnelly as the moment he fell out of love with the game, saying that the game never felt unfair until that moment. The entire city, including a dungeon and boss, was remade in Minecraft in 2018.

References 

Video game locations
Video game levels
Fictional populated places
Dark Souls